Layqa Qullu (Aymara layqa wizard, sorcerer, witch, sorceress, witch doctor, medicine man, qullu mountain, "wizard mountain", also spelled Laica Kkollu) is a  peak in the Cordillera Real in the Andes of Bolivia. It is one of the highest peaks in the Illimani massif. It is situated in the La Paz Department, Murillo Province, Palca Municipality, and in the Sud Yungas Province, Irupana Municipality. Layqa Qullu lies south-east of the highest point of  the massif, north-west of Link'u Link'u and Silla Pata.

References 

Mountains of La Paz Department (Bolivia)